Monte Estância is a mountain in the southeastern part of the island Boa Vista in Cape Verde. At 387 m elevation, it is the island's highest point. It is located 4 km from the Atlantic coast and 23 km southeast of the island capital Sal Rei. It is part of a protected natural space under the statute of natural monument, which covers 739 ha.

See also
List of mountains in Cape Verde

References

Geography of Boa Vista, Cape Verde
Estancia
Estancia